Colour Me Kubrick: A True...ish Story (released in the U.S. as Color Me Kubrick) is a 2005 comedy-drama film directed by Brian W. Cook and released in 2005. The film draws its inspiration from actual events. Starring John Malkovich as Alan Conway, a British con-man who had been impersonating director Stanley Kubrick since the early 1990s, the film follows the exploits of Conway as he goes from person to person, convincing them to give out money, liquor and sexual favours for the promise of a part in "Kubrick's" next film. The soundtrack, Colour Me Kubrick: The Original Soundtrack featured five songs co-written by Bryan Adams.

Plot
Colour Me Kubrick begins with a direct homage to A Clockwork Orange in the aftermath of one of Alan Conway's (Malkovich) minor cons: two thugs are sent to collect a bar bill that Conway has generated by impersonating Kubrick. Unbeknown to them, Conway has provided the address of an elderly couple as Kubrick's home address. Conway is nowhere to be seen and after the thugs cause a ruckus outside the house, the police are called and they are arrested.

Following these events, the audience is taken through several of Conway's scams, including tricking a fashion designer, members of a heavy metal band, and a popular bar owner. All of the victims are deceived into giving "Kubrick" sums of money, free food and drinks, and even sexual favours. Conway actually knows little about Kubrick or his films, so he simply puts on a different persona—from reserved English gentleman to flamboyant Jewish stereotype—with each victim. Conway deceives just about everyone he meets into believing he is the reclusive director, except for a rent boy at a bar, who tests Conway by saying that his favourite Kubrick film is Judgment at Nuremberg; when Conway begins an anecdote about directing the film, the young man tells him casually that Judgment at Nuremberg was in fact directed by Stanley Kramer, and Conway walks away.

Conway also has a run-in with Frank Rich (William Hootkins), a journalist from The New York Times. He meets Rich and his wife in a restaurant and confronts him about an article The New York Times ran on the real Kubrick. He is personally offended that the paper called Kubrick a recluse, and wants them to know that he shaved off his beard. After this chance meeting, Rich investigates Kubrick and finds a picture of him, learning that the real Kubrick looks nothing like the man he met in the restaurant. Rich then instigates Kubrick to look further into the identity of the con man.

One of the biggest scams is when Conway promises to help establish Lee Pratt (Jim Davidson) as a headliner act in Las Vegas. Pratt is a British entertainer who's had limited success as a flamboyant dancer and stage singer. Pratt is described as a "low-rent Liberace with an Elvis gleam in his eye." Conway makes huge promises to get Pratt a permanent seat in the spotlight in Las Vegas.

While Pratt, Conway, and Pratt's manager try to decide how to conquer America, Conway lives a life of luxury at Pratt's expense. 
He sleeps in a high class hotel consuming vodka and cigarettes until a cleaning woman, possibly under the direction of Pratt's manager, discovers a passport with his real moniker printed inside. Conway is thrown out of Pratt's life and off of a pier in a visual and musical homage to A Clockwork Orange.

From there, Rich exposes Alan's lies, and Conway is sent to a hospital after an apparent nervous breakdown which (of course) is just another one of Conway's elaborate ruses. His case is published by his doctor in the medical literature and, courtesy of the British government, he is sent to the Rimini Clinic, a centre where celebrities go for rehabilitation.

Conway is shown to be living the good life, and the film ends with him relaxing in a giant, luxurious hot tub whilst the Ray Noble Orchestra plays the Al Bowlly version of "Midnight, the Stars and You" on the soundtrack, harking back to the finale of The Shining.

Cameos
Colour Me Kubrick has several short cameos.

Production
The idea and screenplay for Colour Me Kubrick was conceived during the filming of Eyes Wide Shut. Alan Conway had been impersonating Kubrick for many years, but it was during the filming of Eyes Wide Shut that the information reached the director. Kubrick's assistant, Anthony Frewin, had been receiving various calls and complaints of people who had met with Conway, while he was impersonating Kubrick, and were offered money, gifts or even parts in upcoming films. Frewin brought the information to Kubrick, who asked to find those affected. Very little progress was made in reprimanding Conway, however, because none of the people who were conned would come forward. Frewin decided to write these accounts and stories into a screenplay, which would later become Colour Me Kubrick.

Brian Cook, an assistant director who worked with Kubrick on many films, including Eyes Wide Shut, read Frewin's work and enjoyed it. Cook also knew of Conway's actions, and how they affected Kubrick's work and personal life. He mentioned that one of the worst incidents was "when he signed Stanley's name on a bank loan for a gay club in Soho". Cook made his debut as director on the film.

Release and reception
Colour Me Kubrick was released in 2006 to various countries (France, Russia, Portugal) and on 23 March 2007 in the United States. The film received generally mixed reviews from film critics. As of April 2009, the film has an average Metacritic score of 57 of 100. Most critics criticised the story for a lack of depth. Tasha Robinson of The A.V. Club stated "it literally only has one idea in its head, and when that idea runs dry, it's as lost as Conway is without his plethora of Kubrick masks."

, the film holds a 51% approval rating on Rotten Tomatoes, based on 61 reviews with an average rating of 5.55/10. The website's critics consensus reads: "Colour Me Kubrick has a fascinating premise, but provides little insight into Kubrick and the man who impersonated him." Brian Tallerico of UGO said "even if the film is essentially a one-man show, a one-man show starring John Malkovich is bound to be really damn good."

Soundtrack

Colour Me Kubrick is the soundtrack EP by Bryan Adams. It was released in 2006.

Track listing

References

External links

2005 films
2000s crime comedy-drama films
Films shot at Elstree Film Studios
French crime comedy-drama films
Cultural depictions of Stanley Kubrick
British crime comedy-drama films
Films about fraud
Gay-related films
Magnolia Pictures films
2005 directorial debut films
2000s English-language films
2000s American films
2000s British films
2000s French films